is a Japanese urban legend about a fictitious railway station. The station first came into the news in 2004, when a ghost story was posted on the internet forum 2channel.

History  
The first mention of Kisaragi Station was late at night on 8 January 2004 on the internet noticeboard 2channel. A person calling herself 'Hasumi' posted a response about a bizarre experience on a thread.

Originating on the 2channel message boards in 2004 and revolves around private railway at Shizuoka. Shared as an anecdote in the thread 'Post About Strange Occurrences Around You: Thread 26', the tale recounted how the anonymous userwho was later identified as 'Hasumi'awoke in a train carriage with all other passengers asleep. As Hasumi struggled with the mystery, she would constantly have exchanges with users at the message board, advising her and sharing such confusion. It was her routine commute to work, but the train was strangely barrelling to a destination without any stops as usual. The conductor and driver were both inaccessible to every effortisolating her from any answers explaining the train deviating from a normal schedule.

Finally, after an unexpectedly long trip of an hour, the train stopped at 'Kisaragi Station' late into the nightan apparently vacant lot of no discernible activity. Hasumi was adamant to leave the train, however, as such a profoundly discomforting experience. Consulting with users online at their thread, Hasumi was advised there is no such station listed online and she should withdraw immediately, but they persisted. As Hasumi wandered outside the station, and took advice from people on the message board, she desperately tried to locate a taxi to no success. Defeated, she discovered a telephone booth, dialed her parents and requested they collect her, but they were unable to determine where she is exactlyKisaragi Station appeared on no maps. Her parents urged her to contact emergency services as 'lost'this would prove futile when they merely dismissed her as a prankster.

Hasumi's experience soon became more ominousbells ringing from the station, a drumbeat intensifying and the overall location completely unidentifiable. Terrified to return into the station with an apparently otherworldly festival transpiring, she climbed onto nearby tracks to abruptly have somebody interrupt who screamed, "Hey! Don't walk on the track, that's dangerous!". Turning around, Hasumi witnessed a one-legged old man, not an attendant, who immediately vanishedher fear only amplified at such a surreal event. In a state of ensuing panic consequently, Hasumi fled along the track rashly and into a darkened tunnel, stumbling and injuring herself in a reckless manner.

She soon reached the end of the tunnel and was welcomed by a friendly man who offered a ride to safetyunusual for this hour and also at such a location. No choices remaining, Hasumi accepted and accompanied the man into a summoned train headed into distant mountains. The 'friendly man' became silent and Hasumi was unnerved as her surroundings became increasingly unfamiliar.

Hasumi completely disappeared and her last message board post was:
"My battery's almost run out. Things are getting strange, so I think I'm going to make a run for it. He's been talking to himself about bizarre things for a while now. To prepare for just the right time, I'm going to make this my last post for now."

References 

Fictional transport buildings and structures
Japanese urban legends